The 2022 IBA Youth World Boxing Championships (22nd) were held in La Nucia, Spain, from 14 to 26 November 2022. The competition was held under the supervision of IBA, the world's governing body for amateur boxing, and was open to boxers born in 2004 and 2005. It was the fourth time in the tournament's history that men and women have fought in the same championship.

Medalists

Men

Women

Medal table

Participating nations 
A total of 598 boxers from 73 nations participated.

 (4)
 (5)
 (11)
 (8)
 (13)
 (5)
 (4)
 (1)
 (3)
 (6)
 (4)
 (7)
 (1)
 (11)
 (12)
 (5)
 (8)
 (5)
 (3)
 (7)
 (4)
 (5)
 (1)
 (12)
 (6)
 (7)
 (6)
 (9)
 (14)
 (8)
 (3)
 (14)
 (25)
 (1)
 (5)
 (24)
 (6)
 (11)
 (16)
 (25)
 (12)
 (6)
 (6)
 (2)
 (21)
 (7)
 (10)
 (2)
 (3)
 (2)
 (3)
 (2)
 (2)
 (6)
 (19)
 (8)
 (14)
 (4)
 (6)
 (5)
 (6)
 (2)
 (12)
 (16)
 (1)
 (11)
 (1)
 (22)
 (25)
 (9)
 (21)
 (4)
 (3)

References

External links 
International Boxing Association
Draw sheets

Youth World Boxing Championships
IBA Youth World Boxing Championships
IBA Youth World Boxing Championships
IBA Youth World Boxing Championships
IBA Youth World Boxing Championships
IBA Youth World Boxing Championships
IBA